Someone who is gifted has an intellectual ability or other talent.

Gifted may also refer to:

Film and television
Gifted (2017 film), a 2017 film starring Chris Evans
Gifted (2003 film), a 2003 British drama television film that was broadcast on ITV
Gifted (Singaporean TV series), a 2018 Singaporean drama
The Gifted (film), a 2014 Filipino catfight comedy-drama film
The Gifted (American TV series), a 2017 American TV series based on characters appearing in X-Men comics
The Gifted (Thai TV series), a 2018 Thai television series
The Gifted: Graduation, a 2020 Thai television series and sequel

Other uses
Gifted (novel), a 2007 novel by Nikita Lalwani
 Gifted (album), a 2022 album by Koffee
 "Gifted" (song), a 2020 song by American rapper Cordae featuring Roddy Ricch
The Gifted (album), the third studio album by American rapper Wale

See also
Gift (disambiguation)